Netley Creek Provincial Park is a Manitoba provincial park on the west shore of the Red River north of Selkirk, Manitoba at the mouth of Netley Creek. It provides visitors with access to these waterways and adjacent Netley-Libau Marsh.

The area was declared a provincial park in 1974.

The park is in the Gimli ecodistrict of the Interlake Plain ecoregion part of the Boreal Plains ecozone.

The Red River is prone to flooding in the spring. The increasing severity of the impact of high water on the park infrastructure and neighbouring cottage leases resulted in a policy to allow much of the park to return to natural vegetation.

See also
List of protected areas of Manitoba
List of provincial parks in Manitoba

References

External links
A System Plan for Manitoba's Provincial Parks A system plan for Manitoba's provincial parks. Winnipeg, Manitoba : Manitoba Sustainable Development, Parks and Protected Spaces Branch, 2018

Provincial parks of Manitoba
Protected areas of Manitoba